The following radio stations broadcast on AM frequency 860 kHz: CJBC Toronto is the Class A station on 860 AM, a Canadian clear channel frequency.

In Argentina 
 Digital in Lanus, Buenos Aires
 LRA56 in Perito Moreno

In Canada 
Stations in bold are clear-channel stations.

In Mexico 
 XECTL-AM in Chetumal, Quintana Roo
 XEMO-AM in Tijuana, Baja California
 XENL-AM in Monterrey, Nuevo Léon
 XEUN-AM in Tlalpan, Mexico City
 XEZOL-AM in Ciudad Juárez, Chihuahua

In the United States

References

Lists of radio stations by frequency